Marrakesh Menara Airport is an international airport serving Marrakesh, the capital city of the Marrakesh-Safi region in Morocco. It is an international facility that receives several European flights as well as flights from Casablanca and some of the Arab world nations. The airport served over 6.3 million passengers in 2019.

History
During World War II, the airport was used by the United States Army Air Forces Air Transport Command as a hub for cargo, transiting aircraft and personnel. It functioned as a stopover en route to Casablanca Airfield or to Agadir Airport on the North African Cairo-Dakar transport route for cargo, transiting aircraft and personnel.

Facilities

Terminal
Menara Airport has two passenger terminals housed in one large building. A third terminal has been built. The existing T1/T2 offer a space of 42,000 m2 and have a designed capacity of 9 million passengers/year. Menara is one of the six airports in Morocco where ONDA offers its special VIP service Salon Convives de Marque.

Runway and apron
Aircraft parking space of  supports up to fourteen Boeing 737s and four Boeing 747s. It can receive all modern jetliners up to the Boeing 747 in size. The airport is equipped with an ILS Cat II landing system and offers the following radio navigation aids: VOR – DME – NDB.

Airlines and destinations
The following airlines operate regular scheduled and charter flights at Marrakesh Menara Airport:

 On selected days, this flight operates from Marrakesh to Zurich via Agadir. However, this carrier does not have rights to transport passengers solely between Marrakesh and Agadir. 

 Flights from Boa Vista and Sal to Marrakech operate as round trips that start and end at Paris Orly Airport.

Statistics

Ground transport
The Spanish bus company Alsa operates regular Route 19 buses every day between Marrakesh Menara airport and both the medina (the stop is in a row of bus stops opposite the Koutoubia Mosque) and the new town.

References

External links

 Marrakech page at ONDA website 
 Marrakech Airport Airport Website with flight arrivals and departures 
 RAK Marrakech Airport Information guide for RAK Marrakech Airport
 
 
 

Airports in Morocco
Buildings and structures in Marrakesh
Airfields of the United States Army Air Forces Air Transport Command in North Africa
World War II airfields in Morocco